The Church of San Pedro de los Francos (Spanish: Iglesia de San Pedro de los Francos) is a church located on Via la Rua in Calatayud, Spain. It was declared Bien de Interés Cultural in 1875.

History
The church was founded by Alfonso I el Batallador, after the Reconquista of Calatayud, to thank his French mercenary troops. The church was built in the 14th-century over an earlier temple. It has a typical Mudéjar structure of 3 naves and apses.

Art and Architecture
 

The entrance portal is Gothic in style with a peaked arch flanked by standing sculptures of St Peter and Paul, while the lintel has some awkwardly seated Christ (center), the Virgin and St John, all sheltered by a ledge with architecture.

Inside the main gilded Retablo at the high altar has Baroque Solomonic columns, and was completed in 1654. Other chapels include a retablo with Renaissance style panels. The various chapels include a virgin in a grotto.

The adjacent ancient mudejar tower leans over the street.

References

See also 
 List of Bien de Interés Cultural in the Province of Zaragoza

Pedro
Gothic architecture in Aragon
Mudéjar architecture in Aragon
Bien de Interés Cultural landmarks in the Province of Zaragoza